The 1907 Maryland Aggies football team represented Maryland Agricultural College (later part of the University of Maryland) in the 1907 college football season. In their first and only season under head coach Charles W. Melick, the Aggies compiled a 3–5 record and were outscored by all opponents, 61 to 45.

Schedule

References

Maryland
Maryland Terrapins football seasons
Maryland Aggies football